HD 204521 is a star in the northern constellation of Cepheus. In the sky it positioned just to the west of the magnitude 3.2 star Beta Cephei (β Cep). This object has a yellow hue similar to the Sun but is too faint to be visible to the naked eye with an apparent visual magnitude of 7.26. It is located at a distance of 86 light years from the Sun based on parallax, and has an absolute magnitude of 5.15. The star is drifting closer with a radial velocity of −77 km/s, and is predicted to come to within  in 334,000 years. At that distance the star can have a relatively small perturbing effect on comets in the Oort cloud.

This is an ordinary G-type main-sequence star with a stellar classification of G0V, indicating that it is generating energy through core hydrogen fusion. It is roughly 8 billion years old and appears metal-deficient. The mass of this star appears to be at or below that of the Sun, and it is radiating 86% of the Sun's luminosity from its photosphere at an effective temperature of 5,699 K.

References

External links 
Wikisky image of HD 204521 (HIP 105766)
List of G stars within 100 light-years

G-type main-sequence stars
Cepheus (constellation)
BD+69 1169
4194
204521
105766